Hi Tech Expressions (later Hi Tech Entertainment) was an American video game publisher  headquartered in Lower Manhattan, New York City. The company was established in 1986. During the course of its existence, the company published primarily juvenile-oriented games. While it published a few adolescent-oriented games including The Hunt for Red October and War in Middle Earth (derived from the classic book The Lord of the Rings by J. R. R. Tolkien), it could not shake its reputation for publishing games marketed towards children. It was closed down in 1995.

List of games

Game Boy 
 Baby's Day Out (cancelled)
 Beethoven's 2nd
 The Hunt for Red October
 Mickey's Ultimate Challenge
 Tom and Jerry
 Tom and Jerry: Frantic Antics
 We're Back! A Dinosaur's Story
 Bobby's World (cancelled)

Sega Mega Drive/Genesis 
 Baby's Day Out (cancelled)
 Barbie Super Model
 Barbie: Vacation Adventure (cancelled)
 A Dinosaur's Tale
 Tom and Jerry: Frantic Antics

Nintendo Entertainment System 
 Barbie
 The Chessmaster
 Fun House
 The Hunt for Red October
 Mickey's Adventures in Numberland
 Mickey's Safari in Letterland
 Muppet Adventure: Chaos at the Carnival
 Orb-3D
 Remote Control
 Rollerblade Racer
 Sesame Street: 1-2-3
 Sesame Street: A-B-C
 Sesame Street: A-B-C/1-2-3
 Sesame Street: Big Bird's Hide and Speak
 Sesame Street: Countdown
 Tom and Jerry
 Twin Peaks (cancelled)
 War in Middle Earth
 Win, Lose or Draw

Super Nintendo Entertainment System 
 Baby's Day Out (cancelled)
 Barbie Super Model
 Beethoven: The Ultimate Canine Caper
 Bobby's World 
 Harley's Humongous Adventure
 The Hunt for Red October
 Mickey's Ultimate Challenge
 Tom and Jerry
 Tom and Jerry 2 (cancelled)
 We're Back! A Dinosaur's Story
 Where in the World is Carmen Sandiego?

DOS 
 Barbie
 Beetlejuice: Skeletons in the Closet
 Bugs Bunny: The Hare-Brained Adventure
 Chip & Dale Rescue Rangers: Adventures in Nimnul's Castle
 Daffy Duck PI: Case of the Missing Letters
 Gremlins 2: The New Batch
 Mega Man (while officially licensed by Capcom, this game is not related to its NES counterpart)
 Mega Man III (while officially licensed by Capcom, this game is not related to its NES counterpart)
 NBA Jam (cancelled)
 Ninja Gaiden
 Sesame Street: Grover's Animal Adventures
 Sesame Street Storybook: Me Look for Cookie
 Street Fighter II
 The Flintstones: Dino: Lost in Bedrock
 The Jetsons: By George, in Trouble Again
 Tom and Jerry (and Tuffy) 
 Tom and Jerry: Yankee Doodle's CAT-astrophe

Defunct companies based in New York City
Defunct video game companies of the United States